Before Pastoral: Theocritus and the Ancient Tradition of Bucolic Poetry is a 1983 book about Theocritus by the classicist David M. Halperin.

Reception
Before Pastoral was praised by the literary scholars Camille Paglia, and Timothy Saunders, who writes that it "still offers the most finely argued case for upholding the distinction between the two categories of 'bucolic' and 'pastoral'."

References

Bibliography
Books

 
 

1983 non-fiction books
American non-fiction books
Books about literature
Books by David M. Halperin
English-language books
Yale University Press books